Catherine Raney Norman (born June 20, 1980 in Nashville, Tennessee) is a four-time Olympic speed skater from Elm Grove, Wisconsin who competed in the 1998 Winter Olympics, 2002 Winter Olympics, 2006 Winter Olympics and 2010 Winter Olympics. She serves as chair of the Salt Lake City-Utah Committee for the Games, which is seeking to bring the Olympics and Paralympics back to Utah in 2030 or 2034.

Raney Norman won the U.S. Allround Championship six times and held three U.S. records. She was the silver medalist in the 1999 World Junior Championships in all around. She was inducted into the U.S. Speed Skating Hall of Fame in 2018.

Since retiring from speed skating, she has focused on service to Olympic and Paralympic sport. In 2012, she was appointed by Utah Governor Gary Herbert as an athlete member of an exploratory committee to investigate a future Olympic and Paralympic Winter Games for the state. In February, 2020, she was named to the inaugural Salt Lake City-Utah Committee for the Games as an athlete board member and co-chair of the Athletes' Advisory Committee with Paralympian Chris Waddell. She is vice chair of the Utah Olympic Legacy Foundation (formerly known at Utah Athletic Foundation), where she joined as a board member in 2011. She was named to chair the committee on June 9, 2021.

References 

 Catherine Raney at International Skating Union
 Catherine Raney-Norman at the United States Olympic Committee
 
 
 
 
 Catherine Raney Norman Olympic Biography

1980 births
Living people
American female speed skaters
Speed skaters at the 1998 Winter Olympics
Speed skaters at the 2002 Winter Olympics
Speed skaters at the 2006 Winter Olympics
Speed skaters at the 2010 Winter Olympics
Olympic speed skaters of the United States
People from Elm Grove, Wisconsin
21st-century American women